HMS Upright was a British U-class submarine, of the second group of that class, built by Vickers Armstrong, Barrow-in-Furness. She was laid down on 6 November 1939 and was commissioned on 3 September 1940.  So far she has been the only ship of the Royal Navy to bear the name Upright.

Career
Upright spent most of her career operating in the Mediterranean, where she sank the Italian submarine chaser , Italian merchants Silvia Tripcovich, Fabio Filzi and Carlo del Greco, the Italian light cruiser Armando Diaz and an Italian drydock under tow.  She also damaged the transport Galilea.  She launched an unsuccessful attack on an Italian floating drydock, and a convoy, missing her target, the Italian merchant Calino. Upright was heavily depth charged by the escorts, following the attack.

Nevertheless, Upright survived the war, and was sold to be broken up for scrap on 19 December 1945. She was scrapped at Troon in March 1946.

References

External links
 
 

 

British U-class submarines
Ships built in Barrow-in-Furness
1940 ships
World War II submarines of the United Kingdom